Store Capital Corporation  (STORE stands for Single Tenant Operational Real Estate) is a private American real estate investment trust headquartered in Scottsdale, Arizona.

History
The company was founded in 2011 and is based in Scottsdale, Arizona.

Backed by Oaktree Capital Management, the company filed for its initial public offering in August 2014 and went public on the New York Stock Exchange later that year. Its stock was added to the S&P 400 stock market index in 2020.

On December 28, 2021, co-founder, executive chairman of the board and former CEO, Christopher Volk, was terminated without cause, receiving cash severance and other benefits in accordance with the terms of his employment agreement.  Tawn Kelley, a board member since 2020 and Vice President of Taylor Morrison Home Corporation, was given the chairman position in a non-executive capacity.

In September 2022, Singaporean sovereign wealth fund GIC and American private equity firm Oak Street, a division of Blue Owl Capital Inc., agreed to acquire Store Capital in an all-cash deal valued at about US$14billion.

Operations
STORE Capital likes to work directly with companies in sale/leaseback transactions, which account for roughly 80% of its acquisitions. The company invest primarily in high-quality properties that are subject to long-term NNN Leases. The company often leases to smaller tenants that do not have credit ratings from major credit rating agencies, and therefore require most of its clients to disclose the profitability for operations attach individual property leased from STORE, which allows the company to independently determine the creditworthiness of its tenants and use this profitability as a source to rent.

At June 30, 2022, the company had a portfolio valued at $11.4 billion and consisting of investments in 3.012 properties operated by 579 clients in 49 American states. Its clients operate in a wide range of service, retail and manufacturing industries in the U.S. economy, including restaurants, theaters, car wash centers, automotive parts and repair shops, pet shops, nurseries and furniture stores. Approximately 94% of the portfolio represents commercial real estate properties subject to long-term leases and 6% represents mortgage loans and financing receivables on commercial real estate properties.

Shareholders
As of Feb 16, 2021, Berkshire Hathaway owned 9% of the company's stock. The company reduced its participation from 9% to 5.26% during Q2 2022.

References

External links 

2014 initial public offerings
American companies established in 2010
Companies based in Scottsdale, Arizona
Real estate companies of the United States
Berkshire Hathaway
2023 mergers and acquisitions
Companies formerly listed on the New York Stock Exchange